Hans Fuß (19 September 1920 – 10 November 1942) was a former Luftwaffe fighter ace and recipient of the Knight's Cross of the Iron Cross during World War II. Hans Fuss was credited with 71 victories in over 300 missions. All his victories were recorded over the Eastern Front.

Career
Fuß was born on 19 September 1920 in Altenhof near Meseritz in West Prussia, present-day Stary Dwór in western Poland. Following flight training, he was posted to 4. Staffel (4th squadron) of Jagdgeschwader 3 (JG 3–3rd Fighter Wing) in early 1941. This squadron was subordinated to the II. Gruppe (2nd group) of JG 3 and was headed by Hauptmann Gordon Gollob at the start of Operation Barbarossa, the German invasion of the Soviet Union.

Eastern Front
II. Gruppe had been ordered to the Eastern Front in preparation for Case Blue, the strategic summer offensive in southern Russia. While based at Pilsen, Hauptmann Kurt Brändle took over command of the Gruppe after the former commander Hauptmann Karl-Heinz Krahl had been killed in action over Malta. The Gruppe was then deployed on the left wing of Army Group South where it was based at Chuhuiv near the Donets on 19 May. There, Fuß served with the Gruppenstab as an adjutant to Brändle.

Squadron leader

On 1 August, Fuß was appointed Staffelkapitän (squadron leader) of 6. Staffel of JG 3 after its former commander Oberleutnant Hans-Jürgen Waldhelm had been transferred. On 7 August, the German 6th Army attacked Soviet forces at Kalach, encircling elements of the Soviet 62nd Army west of the Don. During this battle, II. Gruppe supported the advance, claiming 23 aerial victories, including six by Fuß, making him an "ace-in-a-day".

On 14 September 1942, Fuß claimed a Yakovlev Yak-1 fighter shot down, his last aerial victory claim. During this battle, he engaged with Lydia Litvyak and his Messerschmitt Bf 109 G-2 (Werknummer 13758—factory number) took a hit in the fuel tank causing his engine to seize. Fuß died of gangrene following the amputation of one of his legs at a Luftwaffe hospital in Berlin on 10 November 1942.

Summary of career

Aerial victory claims
According to US historian David T. Zabecki, Fuß was credited with 71 aerial victories. Obermaier and Spick also list Fuß with 71 aerial victories, of which claimed on the Eastern Front in over 300 combat mission. Mathews and Foreman, authors of Luftwaffe Aces — Biographies and Victory Claims, researched the German Federal Archives and found records for 69 aerial victory claims, all of which claimed on the Eastern Front.

Victory claims were logged to a map-reference (PQ = Planquadrat), for example "PQ 4072". These sectors were then subdivided into 36 smaller units to give a location area 3 × 4 km in size.

Awards
 Honor Goblet of the Luftwaffe on 23 March 1942 as Leutnant and pilot
 German Cross in Gold on 10 July 1942 as Leutnant in the II./Jagdgeschwader 3
 Knight's Cross of the Iron Cross on 23 August 1942 as Leutnant and pilot in the II./Jagdgeschwader 3 "Udet"

Notes

References

Citations

Bibliography

 
 
 
 
 
 
 
 
 
 
 
 
 
 
 

1920 births
1942 deaths
Luftwaffe pilots
German World War II flying aces
Luftwaffe personnel killed in World War II
Recipients of the Gold German Cross
Recipients of the Knight's Cross of the Iron Cross
Burials at the Invalids' Cemetery
People from Międzyrzecz County
German amputees
Deaths from gangrene